The politics of Colorado, United States, are that of a blue state. Once considered a purple state that used to be somewhat Republican, Colorado has been trending Democratic since the early part of the 21st century due to changing demographics and a rising number of the large unaffiliated bloc of voters leaning Democratic. The growing shift of the state's Republican Party towards social and religious conservatism along with shifting further to the right has also been cited as reasons for the changing voting patterns of Colorado.  

After showing support for the populist movement between the 1890s and 1910s, Colorado voted for Republicans nationally, all but four times between 1920 and 2004. Only in 1932, 1936, 1964, and 1992 did the state vote Democratic, however, since 2008, Democrats have won the state four cycles in a row, the longest such win streak for the party in the state's history. Democrats have historically faired better for state offices (especially for the governorship), however, they tended to be more moderate than the national party. 

For instance, until the election of Barack Obama in 2008, the people of Colorado had voted Republican in every U.S. Presidential Election since 1964, with the exception of 1992 when a plurality voted for Bill Clinton, possibly due to the effect of Ross Perot's candidacy. Conversely, Colorado has held a Democratic governor for 24 of the past 32 years since 1991.

Political orientation

Colorado has elected 17 Democrats and 12 Republicans to the governorship in the last 100 years. Incumbent Governor Jared Polis, who was elected in 2018, is a Democrat, and his predecessor, Governor, now Senator John Hickenlooper, who won election in 2010 was also a Democrat.

The people of the state of Colorado are also represented in the federal government of the United States by two United States Senators and eight Congressional Representatives. Of Colorado's eight members of the United States House of Representatives, five are Democrats and three are Republicans. The Senators are Michael Farrand Bennet (D) and former Governor John Hickenlooper (D).
 
Colorado has a history of voter initiatives that severely restrict the power of state government. Some of these initiatives include Term Limits on legislators (1990), Taxpayer Bill of Rights (TABOR) (1992), and Amendment 23, passed in 2000, which set a fixed percentage of the budget for K-12 education. Voters passed Referendum C in 2005, amending some restrictions of TABOR and Amendment 23.

History
Colorado supported George W. Bush in both 2000 and 2004. Republicans have generally held control of statewide offices and the state legislature since the 1960s. In 2004, while Bush won the state's electors, while Democrat, Ken Salazar won a U.S. Senate seat and his brother John Salazar won a seat in the U.S. House and the Democrats captured both chambers of the state legislature for the first time since 1963. In 2006, Democrat Bill Ritter won the governorship by a 16-point margin while the Democrats expanded their majorities in both chambers of the state legislature and Democrat Ed Perlmutter captured another U.S. House seat.

Colorado was a battleground state in the 2008 U.S. Presidential Election between Senator John McCain and Senator Barack Obama. Obama won Colorado, by a margin of 9%, with 54% of the vote to McCain's 45%.

In 2010, however, Republicans made big gains in the state. They won the statewide races of Attorney General, Secretary of State, and Treasurer. Republicans also defeated two incumbent Democratic House members to hold a 4-3 majority in the state's House delegation. Furthermore, Republicans took control of the Colorado House of Representatives. This occurred even as Democrat John Hickenlooper won the governorship, albeit over weak and divided opposition, and Democratic Senator Michael Bennet was re-elected. As a result of the 2010 gubernatorial election, the Constitution Party gained major party status as it passed the 10% popular vote threshold, putting it in an equal legal position with the Democratic and Republican parties in terms of rights under state election law. However, the Democrats regained the Colorado House by a large margin during the 2012 election.

Colorado has been trending Democratic in recent years due to the rising percentage of young, college-educated, suburban, and unaffiliated voters leaning Democratic. The growing social and religious conservative shift of the state's Republican Party has also been cited as a reason for the changing voting patterns of Colorado, along with the party shifting right-ward politically. As of 2022, unaffiliated voters made up over 40% of the electorate. These voters tend to lean Democratic or have preferred Democratic candidates over Republican ones in recent elections.

In the 2018 state elections, Democrats gained control of the state Senate, won all the constitutional statewide offices (including the governorship), and expanded their majority in the state House. They also gained a numerical majority for the U.S. House delegation. In the 2020 presidential election, Colorado was considered a safe blue state. Joe Biden handily won Colorado with over 55% of the vote by a margin of more than 13% over Donald Trump. In the 2020 state elections, Democrats retained their majorities in the state House and Senate. Democrats also picked up another U.S. Senate seat with John Hickenlooper's victory over Cory Gardner.

In the 2022 state elections, Jared Polis was re-elected for Governor by a landslide, Democrats easily retained all statewide offices and Michael Bennet was re-elected to the U.S. Senate by the largest margin for a state Democrat since 1974. Additionally, Democrats further expanded their majority in the state house by five seats, grew their senate majority by 2 seats and increased their majority in the state Board of Education.

Colorado General Assembly
Currently, Democrats control both the House and the Senate. The 64th Colorado General Assembly was the first to be controlled by the Democrats in forty years, as the Republican Party traditionally held control of the state government. The current Speaker of the Colorado House of Representatives is Julie McCluskie.

The Colorado Senate is the upper house of the Colorado General Assembly, composed of 35 seats of approximately 143,000 people each. Senators are constitutionally limited to two consecutive four-year terms. The Senate is currently composed of 23 Democrats and 12 Republicans. The Senate is led by President of the Senate, Steve Fenberg, Majority Leader Dominick Moreno, and Minority Leader Paul Lundeen.

The Colorado House of Representatives is the lower house of the Colorado General Assembly, composed of 65 seats of approximately 77,000 people each. Representatives are constitutionally limited to four consecutive two-year terms. The House is currently composed of 46 Democrats and 19 Republicans and is led by Speaker of the House Julie McCluskie, Majority Leader Monica Duran, and Minority Leader Mike Lynch.

Colorado's Federal Representation
Colorado has had eight seats in the United States House of Representatives since the 2020 reapportionment:

Colorado's 1st congressional district is represented by Democrat Diana DeGette of east Denver. The district runs southwest to northeast, containing Columbine in Jefferson County, Englewood and Cherry Hills in Arapahoe County, and all of Denver County.

Colorado's 2nd congressional district is represented by Democrat Joe Neguse of Boulder. The district contains all of Larimer, Grand, Summit, Clear Creek, Gilpin, and Broomfield counties, most of Boulder County, and parts of Jefferson, Eagle, and Park counties.

Colorado's 3rd congressional district is represented by Republican Lauren Boebert of Rifle. This district contains the western third of the state as well as parts of southern Colorado, containing the cities of Grand Junction and Pueblo, the San Luis Valley, and the northeast portion of the Four Corners. Boebert defeated incumbent Scott Tipton for the Republican nomination for this seat in 2020.

Colorado's 4th congressional district is represented by Republican Ken Buck of Windsor. This district contains the eastern third of the state, as well as most of Douglas County along the I-25 corridor, the city of Longmont in Boulder County, and all of Weld County. Together, these comprise 75% of the district's population.

Colorado's 5th congressional district is represented by Republican Doug Lamborn of north Colorado Springs. The district contains Chaffee, Teller, and Fremont counties in their entirety, and most of Park County. The district is anchored in El Paso County, containing 6/7ths of its population. The district is home to major military installations at Fort Carson, Schriever Space Force Base, Peterson Space Force Base, Cheyenne Mountain Complex, and the United States Air Force Academy.

Colorado's 6th congressional district is represented by Democrat Jason Crow of Aurora. This oddly-shaped district contains parts of Adams and Arapahoe counties, as well as Highlands Ranch in Douglas County, but is mostly anchored in Colorado's third largest city, Aurora.

Colorado's 7th congressional district is represented by Democrat Brittany Pettersen of Golden. This district contains the northwestern portion of the Denver Metropolitan Area, including Lakewood, Golden, Arvada, and Westminster in Jefferson County and Thornton, Northgate, and Commerce City in Adams County.

Colorado's 8th congressional district is represented by Democrat Yadira Caraveo. This district contains portions of Adams County, Weld County, and Larimer County.

Democrats John Hickenlooper and Michael Bennet are Colorado's junior and senior United States senators, serving since 2021 and 2010, respectively. 

Colorado is part of the United States District Court for the District of Colorado in the federal judiciary. The district's cases are appealed to the Denver-based United States Court of Appeals for the Tenth Circuit.

Sovereignty of the people
Article II of the Constitution of Colorado enacted August 1, 1876, the Bill of Rights provides:
Section 1. Vestment of political power. All political power is vested in and derived from the people; all government, of right, originates from the people, is founded upon their will only, and is instituted solely for the good of the whole.Section 1, Article II, Constitution of Colorado

Section 2. People may alter or abolish form of government − proviso. The people of this state have the sole and exclusive right of governing themselves, as a free, sovereign and independent state; and to alter and abolish their constitution and form of government whenever they may deem it necessary to their safety and happiness, provided, such change be not repugnant to the constitution of the United States.Section 2, Article II, Constitution of Colorado

Initiative, referendum, and recall
In addition to providing for voting the people of Colorado have reserved initiative of laws and referendum of laws enacted by the legislature to themselves ... the people reserve to themselves the power to propose laws and amendments to the constitution and to enact or reject the same at the polls independent of the general assembly and also reserve power at their own option to approve or reject at the polls any act or item, section, or part of any act of the general assembly. and provided for recall of office holders.

Initiatives and referred laws are considered by the electorate at every general election in Colorado. Many are housekeeping measures or lack substantial public support, but matters of great public concern are also considered such as the Taxpayer Bill of Rights (TABOR), enacted in 1992, which amended Article X of the Colorado Constitution to the effect that any tax increase resulting in the increase of governmental revenues at a rate faster than the combined rate of population increase and inflation as measured by either the cost of living index at the state level, or growth in property values at the local level, would be subjected to a popular vote in a referendum.

Regional differences
Democrats are strongest in the City of Denver, Boulder County, Fort Collins, and parts of the I-70 corridor and the San Luis Valley. The most Democratic counties in the 2012 presidential election were Costilla County in the south which contains San Luis, the oldest town in Colorado, San Miguel County on the western Slope, and Denver County. Counties located in mountain valleys which are also home to ski towns are also Democratic. Pitkin, Eagle, La Plata and Routt are examples of such counties.

Denver's suburban counties usually hold the balance of power in Colorado politics. In recent years, these suburban counties have significantly shifted towards the Democrats. Adams, Arapahoe, Jefferson, Broomfield and Larimer have seen a shift towards voting for Democrats in the last few gubernatorial and presidential elections.

Republicans are strongest in El Paso County, the state's second most populous county and home of Colorado Springs, and Douglas County, an exurb of Denver and one of the wealthiest counties in the country. However, support for Republicans in these areas has been slightly decreasing in recent election cycles. Many Republican votes also come from the western slope near Grand Junction, the high mountain communities in the center of the state, and in the eastern plains. The most Republican counties in the 2012 presidential election were Washington, Cheyenne, and Kiowa in the eastern plains, and Rio Blanco County on the western slope.

These regional differences experienced a boiling point in 2013, when several of Colorado's rural northeastern counties put forth ballot measures designed to initiate secession from the state following the passage of several laws by the state legislature, including expanded background checks for gun purchases, magazine capacity limits on firearms, and a new quota on renewable energy production. The ballot measure was successful in Washington, Yuma, Phillips, Kit Carson, and Cheyenne County with a combined population of around 30,000, but was unsuccessful in Logan, Elbert, Lincoln, Sedgwick, Moffat, and Weld County, which alone was more than twice as populous as all other voting counties combined. The votes were seen as a largely symbolic effort to attract the attention of the then-Democratic Colorado General Assembly; secession of a part of Colorado to create a new state would require approval from the Colorado General Assembly and then the United States Congress under Article IV, Section 3 of the Constitution.

See also

 Elections in Colorado
 Government of Colorado
 Political party strength in Colorado

References

External links

 Elections in Colorado on U.S. Election Atlas website